was a Japanese politician serving in the House of Representatives in the Diet (national legislature) as a member of the Democratic Party of Japan.

Overviews 

He was born in Tokushima, Tokushima prefecture. While studying in the University of Tokyo, he passed the bar exam and therefore dropped out of the university. He was elected for the first time in 1990 as a member of the Japan Socialist Party.

Viewed as a close ally of Prime Minister Naoto Kan, the opposition Liberal Democratic Party has labeled Sengoku as the "second" Prime Minister of the Kan cabinet. Sengoku denies that he wields any extraordinary influence in the government and praised Kan as a "strong leader".

In January 2011, he was ousted from his position as a top cabinet member due to swelling pressure from the opposition, namely the Liberal Democratic Party and Komeito Party, to execute cabinet reform. Sengoku was replaced by Yukio Edano, who was expected to yield much influence over Kan as a protégé of Sengoku.

In March 2011, Prime Minister Naoto Kan appointed Sengoku as Deputy Chief Cabinet Secretary.

He lost his seat in the December 16, 2012 general election.

References

External links 
 Official website 

|-

|-

|-

|-

|-

|-

|-

|-

1946 births
2018 deaths
Democratic Party of Japan politicians
Government ministers of Japan
20th-century Japanese lawyers
Members of the House of Representatives (Japan)
People from Tokushima (city)
Social Democratic Party (Japan) politicians
University of Tokyo alumni
20th-century Japanese politicians
21st-century Japanese politicians
Deaths from lung cancer in Japan